Silokhra  is a village located in Gurugram city in the Gurugram district of Haryana, India. The village has a population of approximately 7715 individuals residing in around 1831 households. Although there are various castes living in the village, Brahmins make up the most significant demographic.  

The farmland surrounding the village has been acquired by developers and transformed into a hub of modern buildings and townships. The Unitech Group has purchased the majority of the village land for a 300-acre residential township consisting of apartments, plots, and private villas. Several notable landmarks, such as the Signature Towers, Crown Plaza, Westin Hotel, Shikshantar School, The World Spa, Uniworld City, and The Palms, are all part of this bustling township.

Sectors 15, Sushantlok, DLF Phase-4, and Sector 29 of Gurgaon were previously part of Silokhra village before being acquired by the Haryana Shahari Vikas Pradhikaran. These areas are now the center of attraction for tourists, as they feature the Kingdom of Dreams, India's first live entertainment theatre, Appu Ghar by Oysters, one of the most popular water parks, and 125 cafes and restaurants.

History
During the early 1800s, when India was under British colonial rule, Silokhra was a part of the Paragana of Badshahpur-Jharsa. This region was ruled by Begum Samru (1753-1836), who constructed a magnificent palace for herself between Badshahpur and Jharsa. Jharsa was the primary cantonment of Begum Samru.

A few years prior to her passing, Begum Samru claimed the offerings made to the Sitla Mata temple in Gurugram during the Chaitra month. The revenue generated from these offerings for the rest of the month was then distributed among the prominent zamindars (landowners) of the area. Additionally, Begum Samru gifted a total of 4400 bigha of land to her priest named Rudaa Pandit, who later founded the village of Silokhra on that land. Rudaa Pandit is considered the founder of Silokhra, and his family still holds a majority of the land in the village today.

Location
Silokhra is near the HUDA City Centre metro station, South City 1, Sector 31, Sector 40 in the middle of Gurgaon. Located on the 28 acre of land, the village falls under the ward number 32 of Municipal Corporation of Gurgaon (MCG).

Climate of Silokhra & Election Results

2011 MCG Elections (Ward 29)

2017 MCG Elections (Ward 32)

See also 
 Delhi Ridge
 Leopards of Haryana
 Gurugram leopard and deer safari
 List of national parks and wildlife sanctuaries of Haryana
 Badshahpur
 Bandhwari
 Gurugram Airstrip

References 

Villages in Gurgaon district